"Bambino" is a song recorded by French singer Dalida that became her first major hit. It was first released on 28 October 1956 as title song of her third EP, prior to her debut album Son nom est Dalida. Bambino spent 45 weeks atop the French song charts, becoming the longest-running number one song in world history.

Description 

"Bambino" was Dalida's first major hit, spending 45 weeks as number 1 in French charts, and topped charts of several other countries.

The song is a French version of the Neapolitan song Guaglione. It also received release on the album Son nom est Dalida in 1957. It was also covered in Arabic language by Jean Dujardin, for the soundtrack of OSS 117: Cairo, Nest of Spies.

Charts

References

Bibliography 

External links 
 Dalida Official Website "Discography" section

Dalida songs
French-language songs 
1956 songs
French songs
1956 EPs